Yannick Rott (born 27 September 1974 in Schiltigheim, Bas-Rhin) is a French former professional footballer who played as a defender. Whilst at Strasbourg he won the 1995 UEFA Intertoto Cup and the Coupe de la Ligue in 1997, playing in the final.

References

External links

Statistics at racingstub.com

1974 births
Living people
People from Schiltigheim
Association football defenders
French people of German descent
French footballers
France under-21 international footballers
RC Strasbourg Alsace players
Toulouse FC players
US Créteil-Lusitanos players
Gazélec Ajaccio players
Gap HAFC players
AS Muret players
Ligue 1 players
Ligue 2 players
Footballers from Alsace
Sportspeople from Bas-Rhin